Build Thy House is a 1920 British silent film directed by Fred Goodwins, and starring Henry Ainley, Ann Trevor, Reginald Bach and Claude Rains in his film debut. The screenplay was written by Eliot Stannard from the story by S. Trevor Jones.

Cast
 Henry Ainley - Arthur Burnaby 
 Ann Trevor - Helen Dawson 
 Reginald Bach - Jim Medway 
 Warwick Ward - Burnaby 
 Jerrold Robertshaw - John Dawson 
 Adelaide Grace - Mrs. Medway 
 Howard Cochran - Marshall 
 Claude Rains - Clarkis 
 R. Van Cortlandt - Mr. Cramer 
 Mrs. Ainley - Miss Brown 
 V. Vivian-Vivian - Florence Burnaby

References

External links
 
 Build Thy House information from the British Film Institute

1920 films
1920 drama films
British silent feature films
British black-and-white films
Films directed by Fred Goodwins
Ideal Film Company films
British drama films
1920s British films
Silent drama films
1920s English-language films